George Maynard may refer to:

 George Maynard (film producer) (19091976) British film producer
 George "Pop" Maynard (18721962) traditional folk singer from Sussex, England
 George W. Maynard (18431923) American painter, illustrator and muralist
 George H. Maynard (18361927) Union Army soldier in the American Civil War and Medal of Honor recipient